Martina Repiská (born 21 October 1995) is a Slovak badminton player. She started playing badminton at the age of nine in her hometown, then playing competitively in the junior international tournament when she was twelve. She became the member of the national team in 2009, and won her first international title at the 2017 Morocco International tournament. Repiská competed at the 2019 European Games. Repiská also competed at the 2020 Tokyo Olympics, and became the third Slovak badminton players at the Olympics.

Achievements

BWF International Challenge/Series 
Women's singles

Women's doubles

Mixed doubles

  BWF International Challenge tournament
  BWF International Series tournament
  BWF Future Series tournament

References

External links 
 

1995 births
Living people
Sportspeople from Zvolen
Slovak female badminton players
Badminton players at the 2019 European Games
European Games competitors for Slovakia
Badminton players at the 2020 Summer Olympics
Olympic badminton players of Slovakia